Koba Jass (born May 1, 1990) is a Latvian professional ice hockey forward, currently playing for HK Kurbads in Latvian Hockey Higher League. He is a two time Latvian champion.

Career
He started his career in 2007 playing for ASK Ogre, which also played in the Latvian championships. In the 2009-2010 season he represented Riga's Dinamo Juniors in the Belarus Extraleague (was one of the captain's assistants.) From 2010-2011 he represented Liepaja Metalurgs in the Belarus Extraleague and also the second team in the Latvian championships.

In the 2011-2012 season he played for Kazakh club Ustjkamenogorsk "Kazzinc-Torpedo" in the Supreme Hockey League and Kazakh championships. In the middle of 2012 Jass trialled for KHL club Dinamo Riga, but he couldn't secure his place at the club. Later that season he played for Slovak Extraleague club HK Zilina, and also Czech Extraleague club HC Kladno.

International
At the 2011 and 2012 World Hockey championships, and at the 2014 Winter Olympics, he competed with the Latvia men's national ice hockey team.

He was named in the Latvia men's national ice hockey team for the competition at the 2014 IIHF World Championship.

Personal
His brother Māris Jass and cousin Mareks Jass are also hockey players. He is of Georgian descent through his father and of Romani descent through his mother.

Career statistics

Regular season and playoffs

International

References

External links

1990 births
Living people
ASK/Ogre players
HC Bílí Tygři Liberec players
HK Liepājas Metalurgs players
Ice hockey players at the 2014 Winter Olympics
Latvian ice hockey left wingers
Olympic ice hockey players of Latvia
Ice hockey people from Riga
Latvian expatriate ice hockey people
Latvian expatriate sportspeople in the Czech Republic
Expatriate ice hockey players in Kazakhstan
Latvian people of Georgian descent
Latvian expatriate sportspeople in Kazakhstan
Latvian expatriate sportspeople in Slovakia
Expatriate ice hockey players in the Czech Republic
Expatriate ice hockey players in Slovakia